{{Infobox television
| image              = Rainbow Rangers logo.png
| genre              = Science fictionAdventureDramedyAction
| creator            = Rob MinkoffShane MorrisTim MansfieldElise Allen
| writer             =
| director           = 
| voices             = Aileen MythenJuliette CrosbiePhilipa AlexanderZehra NaqviPenelope RawlinsDan Russell
| composer           = Paul Westerberg
| country            = United StatesIreland
| language           = English
| num_seasons        = 2
| num_episodes       = 52 (104 segments)
| list_episodes      = 
| executive_producer = Andy HeywardRob MinkoffShane MorrisTim MansfieldElise AllenPaul Cummins
| producer           = Andrew Heyward
| editor             = 
| runtime            = 11 minutes (segments)22 minutes (whole)
| company            = Genius BrandsTelegael
| distributor        = Sony Pictures Television
| network            = Nick Jr.
| picture_format     = 
| first_aired        = 
| last_aired         = present
| related            = Butterbean's CafeRainbow HighThe Legend of KorraSuperhero KindergartenExosquad Generator Rex}}Rainbow Rangers is a computer-animated television series co-produced by Genius Brands and Telegael Teoranta which premiered on Nick Jr. on November 5, 2018. The series follows seven nine-year-old girls who reside in the kingdom of Kaleidoscopia. On April 8, 2019, it was announced that the series was renewed for a second season, which premiered on October 6, 2019. On September 21, 2020, the series announced a third broadcast season that to premiere October 11, 2020. April 12, 2021 confirmed a third season was greenlit.

PlotRainbow Rangers takes place in the magical land of Kaleidoscopia and focuses on the adventures of seven 9-year-old girls—Rosie Redd, Mandarin Orange, Anna Banana, Pepper Mintz, Bonnie Blueberry, Indigo Allfruit, and Lavender LaViolette—who are all represented by the colors of the rainbow. Each use their own powers to help protect the citizens of their land, clean the planet, and make the world a better place.

Each episode begins with a problem with nature seen on Earth. A rainbow is sent to Kaleidoscopia and Kalia calls all seven rangers and Floof to her. After they are shown the nature problem, Kalia chooses the three ideal rangers for the mission, Floof always joins the three on their scooters. When the mission is completed, the three rangers return to Kaleidoscopia on their scooters.

Characters
 Main 
 Rosie Redd (voiced by Aileen Mythen) is the leader. She represents the color Red, and possesses Strength Power (primarily, superhuman strength that only works within a planetary atmosphere), with a special visor in her tiara that allows her to see through objects much like an X-ray.
 Mandarin "Mandy" Orange (voiced by Aileen Mythen) is the cheerleader of the group. She represents the color Orange, and possesses Music Power when using her recorder. She also has sound power, able to hear any sound from wherever the objective of the mission is located. 
 Anna Banana (voiced by Juliette Crosbie) is naive and sweet who can talk to animals. She represents the color Yellow, and possesses Animal Power, being able to communicate with animals. She carries a yellow stuffed rabbit, Mr. Stuffie Wuffie, which is used for comforting animals.
 Pepper Mintz (voiced by Phillipa Alexander) is a shy, introverted bookworm who loves to read. She represents the color Green, and possesses Inviso Power via a special shawl that cloaks whoever is underneath it, rendering them invisible. 
 Bonnie "B.B." Blueberry (voiced by Zehra Jane Naqvi) is analytical and smart. She always says that things are logical or illogical. She represents the color Blue, and possesses Vision Power capable of seeing great distances. She also features a wrist-mounted device known as the Construct-O-Max, which allows her to create, fix or deconstruct whatever the rangers need.
 Indigo "Indy" Allfruit (voiced by Penelope Rawlins), the prankster and the second-in command of the group. She represents the color Indigo, and possesses Speed Power, the ability to run or move at superhuman speeds. According to Mandy, her middle name is "Esmeralda".
 Lavender  LaViolette (voiced by Penelope Rawlins) is a fashionista and a joy. She represents the color Violet, and possesses Micro Power, and in addition to shrinking she also gains a pair of fairy wings that allow her to fly.
 Floof (voiced by Phillipa Alexander) is the Rangers' pet Prismacorn (according to B.B.) who only speaks by saying his name. He is the only male living in Kaleidoscopia, and accompanies them on their mission and helps out by using his magical horn. There is a running gag where Floof comes out of his door in a surprising or funny way.
 Kalia (voiced by Phillipa Alexander) is the leader of Kaleidoscopia and when she sees trouble in the world she calls the rangers to the rescue.

 Villains 
 Preston Praxton (voiced by Dan Russell) is the Rangers' main antagonist. A greedy entrepreneur, he schemes with no regard for any environmental impact, causing the Rangers to try and stop him. He has an endless supply of booby traps to keep the Rangers from interfering with his business, though the rangers have been able to talk him into environmentally friendly solutions with business propositions (or if Patty sides with the Rangers).
 Patty Praxton (voiced by Zehra Jane Naqvi) is Preston's daughter, and while she does take after her money-loving father, she often serves as his voice of reason, and is on friendlier terms with the Rangers.
 Priscilla Praxton (voiced by Dan Russell) debuts in season 2 as Preston's sister, who often competes with him to win Patty's affection and take down the Rangers. She tends to have more feminine schemes such as creating luxury makeup lines or creating glass from sand.

Production
In September 2016, Genius Brands announced that they were partnering with The Lion King and Flypaper director Rob Minkoff and Frozen writer Shane Morris on their new Rainbow Rangers'' series. The show premiered on Nick Jr. on November 5, 2018.

Early designs had the Rangers looking much more stylized than their finalized versions, with minor variations in their powers and personalities, and the original villain was Acrimonia, Kalia's jealous younger sister, instead of Preston Praxton.

Nickelodeon has gained broadcast rights in the United States and Caribbean Basin regions. On April 23, 2019, it was announced that Nickelodeon would also be bringing the show to Latin America.

When the COVID-19 pandemic began to take effect, a special episode of the show was commissioned, "Bunny-20," that streamed online on December 18, 2020, with Pierce Brosnan as a guest voice actor. The episode's goal was to teach young children about ways to keep safe during the pandemic and make it understandable to viewers.

In Summer 2021, the series was streamed on Netflix in late June/early July, though the episodes are shown in production order instead of broadcast order.

Episodes

Series overview

Season 1 (2018–19)

Season 2 (2019–21)

References

External links
 
 

2010s American animated television series
2020s American animated television series
2010s American children's television series
2020s American children's television series
2018 American television series debuts
American children's animated drama television series
English-language television shows
Nick Jr. original programming
Anime-influenced Western animated television series
American computer-animated television series
American preschool education television series
Animated preschool education television series
2010s preschool education television series
2020s preschool education television series
Animated television series about children
Television series about size change
Television series by Sony Pictures Television
Television series set in the future